Mesa Dr/Main St is a station on the Valley Metro Rail line in Mesa, Arizona, United States. The station is located one block east of the intersection of East Main Street and North Mesa Drive, and opened as part of the Central Mesa extension on August 22, 2015. It served as the eastbound terminus of the line until the Gilbert Road extension opened in late Spring 2019.

Nearby landmarks
 Eastern end of downtown Mesa
 Pioneer Park
 Mesa Arizona Temple
 Mesa Municipal Court

References

External links
 Valley Metro map

Valley Metro Rail stations
Transportation in Mesa, Arizona
Railway stations in the United States opened in 2015
Buildings and structures in Mesa, Arizona
2015 establishments in Arizona